Bryan Fairfax (1925–2014) was  an Australian conductor.

Bryan or Brian Fairfax is also the name of:

Bryan Fairfax, 8th Lord Fairfax of Cameron (1736–1802), boyhood friend of George Washington, first American-born member of the House of Lords
Brian Fairfax (1633–1711), English politician

See also
Sir Brian Fulke Cameron-Ramsay-Fairfax-Lucy, 5th Baronet (1898–1974), of the Cameron-Ramsay-Fairfax-Lucy baronets